Salvador Güereña is an archivist, curator, and writer. Güereña specializes in ethnic and multicultural archives, and in digital technologies involving Chicano/Latino arts. Since 1989 he has been Director of the California Ethnic and Multicultural Archives in the University of California, Santa Barbara Davidson Library. He is a published author and editor, including several books and numerous articles in the field of library science, bibliography, and archival science. He was editor and co-author of Library Services to Latinos: an Anthology (2000), and is co-editor and co-author of the forthcoming Pathways to Progress: Issues and Advances in Latino Librarianship (2009).

References

Living people
Year of birth missing (living people)
American librarians